Shine Through It is Terrence Howard's first and only studio album. It was released in the UK on September 1, 2008. It contains 11 tracks all produced by himself and Miles Mosley. All 11 tracks were written by himself, four of which were co written by Miles Mosley, and a further one co written by Ilsey Juber. Most of the album lyrics were inspired by past experiences in his life and some by his children.

Track listing

Charts

References

External links
Terrence Howard interview by Pete Lewis, 'Blues & Soul' September 2008

2008 albums